Amena may refer to:

 Amina (disambiguation)#Amena, the name of several people
Amena, former name of Orange España
Amena, a character in the 1719 novel Love in Excess; Or, The Fatal Enquiry by Eliza Haywood
Hovala amena, a butterfly in the family Hesperiidae

See also
Amenas (disambiguation)
Amenia (disambiguation)